Stefanie Vögele was the defending champion, but chose not to participate.

Anett Kontaveit won the title, defeating Ivana Jorović in the final 6–4, 7–6(7–5).

Seeds

Main draw

Finals

Top half

Bottom half

References 
 Main draw

Engie Open Andrézieux-Bouthéon 42 - Singles